Steggerda is a village of the Dutch municipality of Weststellingwerf. The village consists of one long stretch with housing and has a population of 1,049.

The village was first mentioned in 1408 as Steggerden. The etymology is unknown. Steggerda is a Catholic enclave in a predominantly Protestant region. In 1759, a clandestine church was built on top of a horse barn. In 1839, the first church was built which was replaced in 1921.

Steggerda was home to 560 people in 1840. In 1915, a dairy factory was opened. The factory was supposed to be demolished, however a group of villagers salvaged the steam engine. In 2011, a dairy steam museum opened.

Gallery

References

External links

Geography of Weststellingwerf
Populated places in Friesland